Messier 12 or M 12 (also designated NGC 6218) is a globular cluster in the constellation of Ophiuchus. It was discovered by the French astronomer Charles Messier on May 30, 1764, who described it as a "nebula without stars". In dark conditions this cluster can be faintly seen with a pair of binoculars. In a  scope, the granular core shows a diameter of 3 (arcminutes) surrounded by a 10 halo of stars.

The brightest stars of M12 are of 12th magnitude. With a Shapley-Sawyer rating of IX, it is rather loosely packed for a globular and was once thought to be a tightly concentrated open cluster. Thirteen variable stars have been recorded in this cluster. M12 is approaching us at a velocity of 16 km/s.

A study published in 2006 concluded that this cluster has an unusually low number of low-mass stars. The authors surmise that they were stripped from the cluster by passage through the relatively matter-rich plane of the Milky Way.

See also
 List of Messier objects

Notes

References

External links

Messier 12, SEDS Messier pages
Messier 12, Galactic Globular Clusters Database page
'Stolen' stars article at Universe Today
Messier 12, Amateur astrophotographer (hgg) with a Celestron 9.25"

Globular clusters
Ophiuchus (constellation)
012
NGC objects
17640530